Fabienne Carat (born 24 August 1979) is a French actress and singer.

Debut
Fabienne Carat began the theater at the age of eleven, then left her family at fifteen to complete five years of hotel studies in Biarritz. Then she settled in Paris at the age of 20 in March 2000.

Filmography

Theater

Discography

Album
 2011 : DARKPINK

Other 
In 2015, she was one of the contestants during the Fourth season of Danse avec les stars.

References

External links

1979 births
Living people
French television actresses
French stage actresses
21st-century French actresses
People from Pau, Pyrénées-Atlantiques